Pine Cay is an  privately owned island occupied by 36 homeowners and a small exclusive resort The Meridian Club in the Turks and Caicos Islands.The Meridian Club consists of 13 beachfront hotel rooms, a restaurant, clubhouse and bar. There is also a small spa.

Pine Cay was the site of the first tourist development on the Turks and Caicos. It was planned in the 1950s. The Meridian Club was established in the early 1970s.

Pine Cay is less than a mile wide and two miles (3 km) long, though  of trails thread the island. Island transportation is by electric golf cart and bicycle. There is a paved airstrip that accommodates small private aircraft and helicopters.

Pine Cay is also near Dellis Cay and Fort George's Cay.

External links
 Official Turks and Caicos site on several cays, including this one
 The Meridian Club

Caicos Islands
Private islands of the Caribbean